Spectrum London was a London art gallery which showed contemporary figurative painting, photography and sculpture. It staged Go West, the first commercial West End show of the Stuckists, and a retrospective by Sebastian Horsley. It closed in 2008.

History

In June 2005, the Spectrum London had a show of photographs by Dennis Morris documenting the daily lives, ceremonies and rituals of the Mowanjum Australian Aborigine community. The gallery was blessed by Aboriginal tribe leader, Francis Firebrace, wearing body paint and tribal dress.

Spectrum London was the first West End commercial gallery to show the Stuckists, in the exhibition Go West in October 2006. This "major central London exhibition" elevated the hitherto artworld outsiders into "major players", and occasioned controversy because of a satirical painting of Sir Nicholas Serota and nude paintings of Stella Vine by her ex-husband Charles Thomson." Ten leading Stuckist artists were exhibited. Thomson's and Joe Machine's paintings sold, before the show opened, to buyers from the UK, Japan and the US.

Royden Prior, the director of Spectrum London, said, "These artists are good and are part of history. Get past the art politics and look at the work." Edward Lucie-Smith wrote an essay for the show.

The gallery also exhibited work by Michael Dickinson, who was released from ten days in a Turkish jail without charge after exhibiting a collage of the Turkish prime minister, Tayyip Erdoğan, as a dog.

In March 2006, in association with Sceptre publishing and the Italian Cultural Institute, Spectrum London presented author John Berendt in conversation with Venetian artist, Ludovico de Luigi, during the artist's first solo show in the UK.

In September 2007, it staged Hookers, Dealers, Tailors, a retrospective by Sebastian Horsley. Horsley became known when he underwent a crucifixion in the Philippines; this show documented his diving in Australian shark-infested water and copiously ingesting deadly drugs.

Other artists previously shown at the gallery include Lennie Lee, Rita Duffy, Peter Murphy, Cheryl Brooks, Peter Burke, Antonio Riello, Gerry Burns, Sir Peter Blake and Eduardo Paolozzi.

Spectrum London exhibited at the London Art Fair and Art Madrid.

The gallery was at 77 Great Titchfield Street, London W1. It shut in 2008.

See also
Go West
Stuckist demonstrations

Notes and references

External links
http://www.spectrumlondon.co.uk Spectrum London official website (no longer online)

Defunct art galleries in London
Contemporary art galleries in London
Buildings and structures in the City of Westminster
Year of establishment missing
Art galleries disestablished in 2008
2008 disestablishments in England